Evgeny Sergeyevich Voronov (born May 7, 1986) is a Russian professional basketball player for Parma Basket of the VTB United League. He is also a member of the Russian national basketball team. He is 1.93 m (6 ft 4 in) in height and plays as a shooting guard.

Professional career
Voronov has played with various teams in the Russian Basketball Super League since beginning his professional career in 2005.  In 2006-07, he was a member of EuroCup Challenge winners CSK VVS Samara. While playing with Krasnye Krylya Samara, he averaged 7.1 points per game in 23 league games.

On January 24, 2014, he signed with Triumph Lyubertsy for the rest of the 2013–14 season. On June 12, 2014, he signed a 2+1 deal with Lokomotiv Kuban Krasnodar.

On July 2, 2016, he signed a 1+1 contract with UNICS Kazan. After one season, he left UNICS. On July 5, 2017, he signed with Zenit Saint Petersburg. After averaging 10.8 points and 2.6 rebounds per game in the 2017-18 season, Voronov re-signed with the team on September 7, 2018. On July 17, 2020, Voronov signed with Khimki.

On July 27, 2021, he has signed with Parma Basket of the VTB United League.

Russian national team
Voronov is also a member of the senior Russian national basketball team.  He competed with the team for the first time at the 2010 FIBA World Championship after previously making appearances with the junior national team, including helping the team to a gold medal at the 2005 FIBA Europe Under-20 Championship.  He was part of the Russian team that won the bronze medal at the 2012 Summer Olympics.

References

External links

 Evgeny Voronov at euroleague.net
 Evgeny Voronov at fiba.com

1986 births
Living people
2010 FIBA World Championship players
Basketball players at the 2012 Summer Olympics
BC Dynamo Moscow players
BC Krasnye Krylia players
BC Samara players
BC UNICS players
BC Zenit Saint Petersburg players
Medalists at the 2012 Summer Olympics
Olympic basketball players of Russia
Olympic bronze medalists for Russia
Olympic medalists in basketball
People from Mineralnye Vody
PBC CSKA Moscow players
PBC Lokomotiv-Kuban players
Russian men's basketball players
Shooting guards
Sportspeople from Stavropol Krai
Universiade medalists in basketball
Universiade silver medalists for Russia